Kévin Koubemba (born 23 March 1993) is a professional footballer who plays as a striker for Liga I club Argeș Pitești. Born in France, he represented the Republic of Congo national team.

Career
Born in Coulommiers, Koubemba has played for Amiens, Lille, Brest, and Sint-Truiden.

On 31 January 2017, Koubemba signed contract with Bulgarian club CSKA Sofia. He left the club in January 2018.

On 23 July 2018, Koubemba signed a contract with Azerbaijan Premier League side Sabail FK.

On 7 June 2019, Koubemba signed a two-year contract with Azerbaijan Premier League side Sabah FK.

After playing in Albania with Teuta, in 2022 he signed for Malaysian club Kuala Lumpur City. He then played for Chornomorets Odesa.

International career
He made his international debut for Congo in 2014. He was initially part of Congo's 38-man provisional squad for the 2015 Africa Cup of Nations, but was dropped from the list after a week.

International stats

References

1993 births
Living people
Footballers from Seine-et-Marne
Republic of the Congo footballers
Republic of the Congo international footballers
French footballers
French sportspeople of Republic of the Congo descent
Amiens SC players
Lille OSC players
Stade Brestois 29 players
Sint-Truidense V.V. players
PFC CSKA Sofia players
Sabail FK players
Sabah FC (Azerbaijan) players
Ligue 2 players
Ligue 1 players
Liga I players
Azerbaijan Premier League players
Ukrainian Premier League players
Association football forwards
Belgian Pro League players
Republic of the Congo expatriate footballers
Expatriate footballers in Azerbaijan
Republic of the Congo expatriate sportspeople in Azerbaijan
Expatriate footballers in Ukraine
Republic of the Congo expatriate sportspeople in Ukraine
Expatriate footballers in Romania
Republic of the Congo expatriate sportspeople in Romania
Expatriate footballers in Albania
Republic of the Congo expatriate sportspeople in Albania
Expatriate footballers in Bulgaria
Republic of the Congo expatriate sportspeople in Bulgaria
Expatriate footballers in Malaysia
Republic of the Congo expatriate sportspeople in Malaysia
KF Teuta Durrës players
Kuala Lumpur City F.C. players
Black French sportspeople
FC Chornomorets Odesa players
FC Argeș Pitești players
People from Coulommiers